The 1949 Allan Cup was the senior ice hockey championship of the Canadian Amateur Hockey Association (CAHA) for the 1948–49 season.

Final 
Best of 7
Ottawa 6 Regina 4
Ottawa 3 Regina 1
Ottawa 7 Regina 0
Regina 6 Ottawa 3
Ottawa 5 Regina 3

Ottawa Senators beat Regina Capitals 4-1 on series. W. B. George presented the Allan Cup trophy to the Senators who won the first senior championship title by an Ottawa team in 41 years.

References

External links
Allan Cup archives 
Allan Cup website

 
Allan Cup
Allan